Peppermint Candy is a 1999 South Korean drama film by Lee Chang-dong, his second. The film opens with the implied suicide of the protagonist and uses reverse chronology to depict some of the key events of the past 20 years of his life that led to this point. It was the ninth highest grossing domestic film of 2000 with 311,000 admissions in Seoul.

It was well-received, especially at film festivals. Spurred by the success of Lee Chang-dong's directorial debut, Green Fish, Peppermint Candy was chosen as the opening film for the Busan International Film Festival in its first showing in 1999. It won multiple awards at the Karlovy Vary International Film Festival and won the Grand Bell Awards for best film of 2000.

Plot
The film is divided into 7 sections, each dated and titled. They are presented in the order in which they are presented in the film. Each section is preceded by a 10 to 15 second-long shot from the top of a train as it heads out of a tunnel towards mountains, with variations.

Outdoor Excursion, Spring 1999
A group of friends have gathered by a river for a picnic for the first time in 20 years. A middle-aged Korean man named Kim Young-ho wanders to the group; the members have not heard from him in many years and have limited knowledge of his past 20 years. After causing general mayhem with his deranged antics, he leaves and climbs atop a nearby train track; one of the friends tries to convince him to abandon suicide, but the others ignore him and dance. Facing an oncoming train, he exclaims "I want to go back again!" in a freeze frame.

The Camera, 3 days ago, Spring 1999

While driving, Young-ho hears on the radio about a member of the group announcing their imminent reunion. He spends the last of his money on a pistol and contemplates who he should kill while he takes his own life. After confronting his former business partner and ex-wife Hong-ja, the husband of his old flame Sun-im pays him a surprise visit. Young-ho is taken to visit a comatose Sun-im in a hospital, and presents her some peppermint candies that she used to give him while he was in the military. A tear trickles down Sun-im's face.

Before parting, Sun-im's husband gives Young-ho an old manual camera. He sells it nevertheless.

Life is Beautiful, Summer 1994

At first glance, Young-ho appears to be a rather successful businessman, but the problems in his life become clear when he confronts his wife, who is having an affair with her driving instructor. Young-ho is unable to claim moral high ground, since he is also shown having an affair with an assistant from work. After having sex with his assistant, Young-ho dines with her and coincidentally encounters a man he has not seen in years. Young-ho tells him that he quit the police force two years ago. In an awkward bathroom exchange, Young-ho asks the man if life is beautiful; he agrees. Finally, Young-ho is shown with his wife and daughter at their new house, eating with his colleagues. As Hong-ja's grace becomes a bawl, Young-ho storms out of the house.

Confession, Spring 1987

Young-ho is a police officer, his wife about to deliver their daughter. While getting a haircut, he encounters the man he later meets at the restaurant, apprehends him, and brutally tortures him for information about another man's whereabouts. This leads Young-ho to Kunsan, coincidentally Sun-im's hometown. There, he and his fellow police officers capture the wanted man. While his fellow police officers wait to catch the man in question, Young-ho fruitlessly searches for Sun-im and instead ends up on a one-night stand with a woman. The next morning, they catch the man and return to the police station. The woman Young-ho had a one-night stand with fruitlessly waits for him.

Prayer, Fall 1984

Young-ho is just starting out as a policeman and is pressured by his peers to torture a crime suspect, presumably a student demonstrator. Hong-ja, then a restaurant owner, takes interest in him. One day, Young-ho is visited by Sun-im. She tells him how she had visited him while he was in the military, but was denied a chance to meet him, and gives him a camera he had, reminding him how he always wanted to become a photographer. He coldly and cruelly dismisses her by feigning interest in Hong-ja and returns the camera to Sun-im as she leaves by train. One night, a deranged Young-ho barks military commands at the patrons of Hong-ja's restaurant and wreaks havoc. Later, Young-ho is shown sleeping with Hong-ja, who tries to show him how to pray.

Military Visit, May 1980

While Sun-im is trying to visit Young-ho while he is performing his mandatory military service, his company is ordered to quell the Gwangju Democratization Movement and she doesn't get a chance to be with him. Young-ho gets shot, presumably by friendly fire, in the leg and stays behind. While waiting for help, a harmless and presumably innocent student approaches him, pleading to be allowed to go home despite violating enforced curfew; standing in the darkness, he initially misconstrues her as Sun-im. Just as he is about to let her off, soldiers arrive. Not wanting his comrades to realize he had let a civilian go, he fires randomly, hoping to fool the soldiers into believing he is doing his duty, but accidentally shoots and kills the girl. As the other soldiers gather around, he embraces her and bawls.

Picnic, Fall 1979

Young-ho is a part of the student group gathering at the same river for a picnic, and there, he meets Sun-im, at the time packing peppermint candies for a factory, for the first time. He expresses a clear interest in photography and her, and tells her that while he'd never been at that river before, he had seemingly seen the location in his dreams. While the others gather around to sing, Young-ho wanders off, lies down on the river bank, and stares up at the sky. As the sound of a passing train is heard, a tear trickles out of an eye and the frame freezes.

Main cast
Sol Kyung-gu as Kim Yong-ho
Moon So-ri as Yun Sun-im
Kim Yeo-jin as Hong-ja
Park Soo-young as Operative	
Park Sung-yeon as Factory worker

Analysis
The events of Yong-ho's life that are shown in the movie can be seen as representing some of the major events of Korea's recent history. The student demonstrations of the early 1980s leading to the Gwangju massacre are shown, as Yong-ho becomes traumatized by the shooting incident. The tightening grip on the country by the military government during the 1980s is mirrored by Yong-ho losing his innocence and becoming more and more cynical during his stint as a brutal policeman. Similarly, Yong-ho losing his job during the late 1990s mirrors the Asian financial crisis.

Yong-ho's life represents the struggle between historiography and psychoanalysis. Despite his desperate desire to move on from his past, mnemonic traces overpower the psychoanalytical aspects of his life. These mnemonic traces include the train, the camera, and the peppermint candy as well as Sun-im and her surrogates throughout the vignettes, which led the psychoanalysis of his life to triumph over historiography. The relationship between historiography and psychoanalysis can be seen in historicism and progressivism, where Yong-ho chooses to look back on his past instead of looking solely at his future to move forward. The major traumatic events that were historically imposed on him were so embedded in his life that he could not simply move on. However, finally reflecting back on his past allows him to accept what happened and finally advance into the future. Unfortunately, this was moments before he committed suicide when he turned to face the train. The train is the symbol that guides the film in reverse chronology, and his cry to return to the past signifies his tragically late recognition of the past's significance for his life.

Issues of masculinity in South Korean culture arise in the film. Yong-Ho's masculinity is broken during the Gwangju Massacre scene in which the militarized masculinity enforced by the Korean government — a required 26-month duty in the military, an order to kill innocent civilians, and a need to conform to the standards of the other soldiers around him — ultimately force Yong-Ho to compensate later in life by interrogating the student protesters who inevitably were the reason he was put in that situation. This theme continues with the way he treats women later on in his life, objectifying and mistreating his wife Hong-ja and ultimately losing his one link back to his innocence, Sun-im. What results in the beginning of the film, which will be the end of Yong-Ho's life, is an ultimate humiliation and a lamentation for a lost innocence where personal history is connected with the history of South Korea.

Critical Reception
In 2020, the film was ranked number 12 among the classics of modern South Korean cinema by The Guardian's Peter Bradshaw.

Awards and nominations
2000 Baeksang Arts Awards
Best New Actor - Sol Kyung-gu

2000 Grand Bell Awards
Best Film
Best Director - Lee Chang-dong
Best Supporting Actress - Kim Yeo-jin
Best Screenplay - Lee Chang-dong
Best New Actor - Sol Kyung-gu

2000 Blue Dragon Film Awards
Best Actor - Sol Kyung-gu
Best Screenplay - Lee Chang-dong

35th Karlovy Vary International Film Festival
Special Jury Prize (tied with The Big Animal)
Don Quijote Award
Netpac Award - Special Mention
Nominated for the Crystal Globe

References

External links

North American Site (In English)
Official site (mostly in Korean)
Review at koreanfilm.org
Anthony Leong's review at mediacircus.net

1999 drama films
South Korean drama films
South Korean independent films
Police detective films
South Korean nonlinear narrative films
Films about suicide
Films set in 1979
Films set in 1980
Films set in 1984
Films set in 1987
Films set in 1994
Films directed by Lee Chang-dong
Best Picture Grand Bell Award winners
2000s Korean-language films
2000s South Korean films